Indane is a hydrocarbon petrochemical compound, with formula C9H10.

Indane may also refer to:

Business
Indane (LPG), LPG brand developed and owned by Indian Oil Corporation in India

Chemistry
Indium trihydride, also called indane
Indane-5-sulfonamide, base structure of indanesulfonamides